Barbara G. Ryder is an American Computer Scientist noted for her research on programming languages and more specifically, the theoretical foundations and empirical investigation of interprocedural compile-time analysis.

Biography
Ryder received an A.B. in applied mathematics  from Brown University in 1969. She received a M.S. in computer science from Stanford University in 1971 and a Ph.D in computer science from Rutgers University in 1982.

She then joined the Department of Computer Science at Rutgers University as an assistant professor in 1982. While there she was promoted to associate professor in 1988 and to professor in 1994. In 2008, she moved to Virginia Tech as head of the Department of Computer Science. She retired in 2016.

Awards

In 1998 
she was named an ACM Fellow.

Her other notable awards include:

 ACM Presidential Award (2008)
 ACM SIGPLAN Distinguished Service Award (2001)

 PLDI'92 paper selected for Best of PLDI Collection 1970–1996 in April 2003. The paper was titled: A Safe Approximate Algorithm for Interprocedural Pointer Aliasing.

References

External links
 Virginia Tech: Barbara Ryder, Department of Computer Science

Year of birth missing (living people)
American women computer scientists
American computer scientists
Virginia Tech faculty
Rutgers University faculty
Fellows of the Association for Computing Machinery
Living people
Brown University alumni
Stanford University alumni
Rutgers University alumni
American women academics
21st-century American women